The Datsun redi-Go is a city car produced by Datsun, a brand from Nissan, initially intended for the Indian market. A concept vehicle was unveiled at 2014 Auto Expo and the production model was unveiled on 14 April 2016. The redi-Go is targeted at a younger market.

Characteristics 

In addition to the original 0.8-litre engine, a 1.0-litre BR10 engine option was also added in 2017.

The redi-Go is comparably lighter, shorter, and has a larger ground clearance than the Kwid.

Safety 
The redi-Go for India with driver airbag received 1 star for adult occupants and 2 stars for toddlers from Global NCAP in 2019 (similar to Latin NCAP 2013).

References

External links 
 

redi-Go
Cars introduced in 2016
2020s cars
City cars
Hatchbacks
Front-wheel-drive vehicles
Global NCAP superminis